Bishop George (secular name Alexander Ivanovich Griaznov,  (January 26, 1934 – April 1, 2011) was the Russian Orthodox archbishop of Chelyabinsk and Zlatoust and later bishop of Lyudinovo, auxiliary bishop of the Kaluga eparchy.

References

1934 births
2011 deaths
People from Vladimir Oblast
Bishops of the Russian Orthodox Church